Episcepsis lamia is a moth of the family Erebidae. It was described by Arthur Gardiner Butler in 1877. It is found in the Amazon region, Guatemala and Costa Rica.

Description
Head and thorax fuscous brown; two scarlet spots on back of head and two on lower part of tegulae; fore coxae crimson; abdomen metallic blue green, with the rough hair at base blackish; the ventral surface fuscous, with sublateral white lines on basal half. Forewing uniform fuscous brown. Hindwing black, shot with blue; hyaline streaks in, below, and beyond cell; the tuft on inner area whitish.

Wingspan 34 mm.

References

External References
Episcepsis lamia at BHL
 Retrieved April 20, 2018.

Euchromiina
Moths described in 1877